Gothra is a census town in Jhunjhunu district in the Indian state of Rajasthan.

Geography 
It has an average elevation of 328 metres (1076 feet).

Demographics 
 India census, Gothra had a population of 21,819. Males constitute 54% of the population and females 46%. Gothra has an average literacy rate of 77%, higher than the national average of 59.5%: male literacy is 86%, and female literacy is 67%. In Gothra, 10% of the population is under 6 years of age.

References 

Cities and towns in Jhunjhunu district